Mickaela Skaric (born 24 October 2001) is a Chilean badminton player. In 2016, she became the runner-up at the Chile International tournament in mixed doubles event partnered with Alonso Medel, and the semi-finalists in women's singles event.

Achievements

BWF International Challenge/Series 
Mixed doubles

  BWF International Challenge tournament
  BWF International Series tournament
  BWF Future Series tournament

References

External links 
 
 

2001 births
Living people
Chilean female badminton players